German submarine U-116 was a Type XB minelaying U-boat of Nazi Germany's Kriegsmarine during World War II.

She was ordered	on 31 January 1939 and laid down on 1 July at Friedrich Krupp Germaniawerft, Kiel, as yard number 615. She was launched on 3 May 1941 and commissioned under the command of Korvettenkapitän Werner von Schmidt on 26 July of that year.

Service history

1st patrol
After a period of training as part of the 2nd U-boat Flotilla, U-116 was assigned to the front-line as part of the 1st U-boat Flotilla on 1 February 1942. She sailed from Kiel on 4 April 1942, bound for Bergen, Norway, via Heligoland, and departed Bergen on 25 April, circling the British Isles before arriving at Lorient in occupied France, on 5 May.

2nd patrol
U-116 sailed from Lorient on 16 May 1942 on a patrol to the mid-Atlantic lasting 25 days, arriving back at her homeport on 9 June, without any success.

3rd patrol
U-116 was more successful on her third patrol which took her south to the coast of West Africa, attacking Convoy OS-33 south of the Azores on 12 July 1942.
Nine hours later U-116 fired two torpedoes into the 4,284 GRT British merchant ship Shaftesbury, which sank in 15 minutes.
The U-boat returned to Lorient on 23 August, after 58 days at sea.

4th patrol
For her fourth patrol, U-116 sailed under the command of Oberleutnant zur See Wilhelm Grimme. Leaving Lorient on 22 September 1942, she sent her last radio message on 6 October whilst in the North Atlantic at position , and was never heard from again. 56 men were lost with her.

Summary of raiding history

References

Bibliography

External links

 

German Type X submarines
U-boats commissioned in 1941
U-boats sunk in 1942
World War II submarines of Germany
World War II shipwrecks in the Atlantic Ocean
Missing U-boats of World War II
1941 ships
Ships built in Kiel
U-boats sunk by unknown causes
Maritime incidents in October 1942